Someday Providence is an alternative/rock/reggae band from Providence, Rhode Island, United States.  They are known for their seasonal song "Summertime in Rhode Island", which used to be played every year on WBRU during the summer.  They have been acknowledged as heavy hitters in the local scene by winning "Best Breakthrough Act (2006)" and "Best Local Act (2007)" award in the annual Providence Phoenix Best Music Poll.  2008 showed them similar favor as finalists in the WBRU Rock Hunt. The Providence Journal called them "one of Rhode Island’s best-ever good-time bands".

Discography

Full length albums
 The Hidden Vibe (2006) (White Noise Records)
 Thanks for Listening (2008) (self-released)

Singles
 Summertime In Rhode Island (2006)
 The Gentleman (2008)

Trivia
Many songs from the album The Hidden Vibe have been featured on MTV shows such as The Hills.<ref>CHRIS CONTI (April 23, 2008). "[http://thephoenix.com/Providence/Music/60361-Mix-n-mashup/ The Phoenix > Music Features > Mix ’n’ mashup". The Providence Phoenix]".</ref>
"Be My Baby Tonight" played at the end of the MTV show Next''.

References

Alternative rock groups from Rhode Island
American pop music groups
American reggae musical groups
American ska musical groups
Musical groups established in 2005
Musical groups from Rhode Island